Pulatan is a village and jamoat in north-western Tajikistan. It is part of the city of Konibodom in Sughd Region. The jamoat has a total population of 26,031.

References

Populated places in Sughd Region
Jamoats of Tajikistan